The Southern Front was a Syrian rebel alliance consisting of 54 or 58 Syrian opposition factions affiliated with the Free Syrian Army, established on 13 February 2014 in southern Syria.

By June 2015, the Southern Front controlled about 70 percent of Daraa Governorate, according to the International Institute for Strategic Studies., but by 2018, the Front was defunct, with most of its fighters either integrating into Assad's army, or fleeing to FSA held lands in the north.

Claims have been made by the Southern Front itself and by media in Britain, Germany and the United Arab Emirates that the Southern Front is being funded by the US and its allies, possibly through a US led Military Operations Center (MOC) based in Amman, Jordan. Since its formation, rebels said, field operation rooms have been added inside Syria to improve coordination between units. The coalition was "described by Western officials as the best organized of the mainstream opposition". The constituent groups ranged from secularist groups to moderate religious groups, and the Southern front has been described as a "non-hardline Islamist rebel group" that rejects extremism.

Nature of the Front 
The Southern Front was an alliance of over 50 rebel groups, ranging from secularist to moderately religious. Bashar al-Zoubi, head of the Yarmouk Army, said to the BBC in 2014 that the groups or factions of the Southern Front are militarily coordinated by a moving command centre with a unified leadership but with no overall commander and no centralised command—which is contradictory.

The Carter Center, a private organization in the U.S. promoting human rights globally, in February 2015 also described the Southern Front as a loose coalition of self-described moderate armed groups without leadership or organizational structure, that agreed on the name ‘Southern Front’ to receive support from the inter-governmental Friends of Syria through the southern MOC ("Military Operations Center") in Amman.

The relation between Southern Front and Syrian armed rebel group Free Syrian Army (FSA) has been described differently by different news sources.
Remarks of news sources about such relation are in some cases more or less compatible, in other cases incompatible. Some statements in chronological order:

The Syrian Observer on 14 February 2014 stated that 49 rebel groups in southern Syria had announced in a statement the establishment of ‘The Southern Front’ and suggested vaguely that that Southern Front were affiliated with FSA.
 The Carnegie Endowment for International Peace mentioned on 21 March 2014 that the ‘Omari Brigades’, one of the FSA units from 2011, became a member faction of 'Syrian Revolutionaries Front' (created in December 2013) which was in mid-February 2014 one of the 49 factions that banded together as the Southern Front signing a statement.
 The Huffington Post stated on 15 May 2014 that a loose coalition of about 50 rebel units including the largest FSA units in southern Syria in February 2014 had announced the establishment of the Southern Front.
 The National Interest stated on 6 July 2015 that the Southern Front is a coalition of Free Syrian Army brigades, which had made significant gains in Daraa Governorate.
 Dutch newspaper NRC Handelsblad wrote on 10 October 2015: "Saudi Arabia is increasing its weapons deliveries to Syrian rebels. That concerns three different groups: Jaish al-Fatah, the Free Syrian Army, and the Southern Front."
 The International Business Times on 12 March 2016 made mention of a ‘Southern Front’ which it describes as a group of Syrian opposition groups formerly members of FSA, focusing primarily on the Daraa and Quneitra governorates.

History

Formation
In mid-February 2014, according to a Syrian rebel brigade officer, the Military Operations Command (MOC) in Jordan designed for channeling Western and Gulf aid to moderate rebel forces in southern Syria convened a meeting with leaders of nearly 50 southern rebel groups and directed them to create a new umbrella coalition. This resulted in the "Southern Front" being formed on 13 February 2014.

The formation of the front and its backing by western forces challenged al-Nusra's military and political success in the region, though Southern Front units continued to cooperate with al-Nusra forces.

The Southern Front quickly became the largest rebel fighter umbrella organization in Southern Syria, comprising 25–30,000 fighters, the great majority of the South's rebel groups and manpower.

Initial growth

On 13 November 2014, it was reported that 15 factions of the Southern Front drew up a political program as an alternative to the exile-led opposition in Turkey, in which they are planning to turn the Southern Front into a civilian security force. At the same time a provincial council was established. This political program is intended to have "broad appeal among Syrian civilians and to undercut support for more extreme interpretations of Islam that has been spreading".

Around that time, almost 40 small rebel groups joined the First Corps in the south.

On 27 December 2014, the 18 March Division, Yarmouk Army, Fallujah of Houran Brigade and Lions of Sunna Brigade merged under the command structure of the Hawks of the South coalition to strengthen the Southern Front.

On 1 January 2015, the Hamza Division, Syria Revolutionaries Front (SRF) southern command and 1st Artillery Regiment merged under the command structure of the First Army.

As of February 2015, Southern Front operations were executed through seven 'Southern Front operation rooms'.

On 15 May 2015, the Southern Front unified under one military council, chaired by 7 senior members. On 1 June 2015, the Southern Front paraded for the graduation of one thousand new members.

In June 2015, the SF launched Operation Southern Storm to take Deraa city's northern and eastern districts from government control. The operation was largely unsuccessful.

Decline from late 2015
After Operation Southern Storm, SF declined in size and lost some of its support from the MOC. In late 2016, its then 58 groups were re-organised around four of the largest units with close ties to the MOC: Youth of Sunnah Brigade, Yarmouk Army, 24th Infantry Division and Amoud Houran Division.

On 18 June 2018, the Southern Front was hit by "Operation Basalt", a pro-Syrian government offensive in Daraa and Quneitra province. By 23 July the forces of the Southern Front were fully defeated, and lost all territory that was under their control. Surrendering fighters agreed to either reconciliation deals or were relocated to Idlib.

Many of the "reconciled" fighters have gone on to participate in the Daraa insurgency, starting on 23 November 2018 (including the March 2020 Daraa clashes).

Support and funding 

General Ibrahim Jbawi, spokesperson for the Southern Front, stated in November 2014 that his group received money and weapons from the US, France, Jordan and Saudi Arabia. Activists said that Jordan also facilitated the Southern Front by allowing them to cross freely to and from Jordan.

The Abu Dhabi (United Arab Emirates) based newspaper The National stated in November 2014 that the Military Operations Command centre (MOC) in Amman, Jordan, staffed by "western and Arab military officials", had sent out food baskets to six rebel factions in southern Syria, presumably members of the Southern Front. The BBC, not revealing its sources, claimed in December 2014 that the Southern Front was "backed" through the Military Operations Center in Jordan, "a logisitics and supply hub" run by the US with European and Arab allies.
The German Heinrich Böll Foundation claimed in 2015 that the Southern Front is being "funded" by a Military Operations Center (MOC) in Amman, Jordan which is run by "the US and its allies", but did not specify or corroborate what that "funding" implied. No American official has yet admitted to the US supporting the Southern Front. The MOC has reportedly been inactive since 2017.

The National also reported that Southern Front members participating in the fight against the Syrian government receive $50–$100 per month while those who fight against ISIL receive $100–$250 per month from the MOC. However, the MOC threatened to cut funds unless the SF launch an offensive against ISIL.

Leadership

 Brig. Gen. Bashar al-Zoubi(former overall Leader)
 Brig. Gen. Ziad Fahd(Deputy Chief of Staff)
 Lt. Col. Majid al-Sayid Ahmed(Head of the Operations Department)
 Col. Saber Safar(Member of the Military Council)
 Col. Bakur Salim al-Salim(Member of the Military Council)
 Col. Khaled al-Nabulsi(Member of the Military Council)
 Maj. Hassam Ibrahim(Member of the Military Council)
 Capt. Said Nakresh(Member of the Military Council)
 Ahmad al-Awdesh(Member of the Military Council)
 Samer al-Haboush(Member of the Military Council)
 Maj. Issam Rayes(Spokesperson)

Military activities

Overview

On 25 March 2015, the Southern Front captured the town of Bosra after a 3-day long battle.

On 1 April 2015, the Southern Front captured the Nasib border crossing, the last government-controlled border crossing into Jordan.

After the Southern Front's strategic victory at the capture of Brigade 52 in early June 2015, an analyst from the Institute for Strategic Studies stated that "The Southern Front is now showing itself as an increasingly effective buffer against Islamist rebels as well as an effective means for applying pressure on the Assad regime", and Southern Front spokesman Issam al-Reis stated that "We have most of Daraa liberated, our lines of defense behind us are solid, and now we can start the operation toward Damascus and the highway leading to it".

On 17 June 2015, the Southern Front launched an offensive to take all of Quneitra province.

On 25 June 2015, the Southern Front announced "Southern Storm", an offensive to capture Daraa city, where the Syrian Revolution began in 2012. By mid-August the offensive had failed to make significant advances, but the government had responded by increasing attacks on civilian neighborhoods, killing dozens of civilians, leading to public demonstrations against the Southern Front's failed strategy. An analysis by the Heinrich Böll Foundation suggested that the Southern Front had failed to receive significant support from the Military Operations Center in Jordan.

In July and August 2016 more than 200 rebels from the Southern Front defected to Jabhat Fateh al-Sham, successor to al-Nusra Front, and Ahrar al-Sham due to better pay and more willingness to fight government forces.

In the second half of 2016, Southern Front member groups where involved in failed operations against ISIS, those being the 2016 Abu Kamal offensive and the Eastern Qalamoun 2016 offensive.

On 12 February 2017, Free Syrian Army groups (Southern Front and the Army of Free Tribes), Tahrir al-Sham, Ahrar al-Sham, Jaysh al-Islam, Jabhat Ansar al-Islam, and Alwiya al-Furqan - working together as part of the Unified Ranks operations room - launch an offensive in Daraa. A week into the first phase of the offensive, ISIL also started an offensive against the Daraa-based rebels, lasting a week and resulting in an ISIL victory. Clashes between the Southern Front-led rebels and ISIL continued for the next few months.

After three phases, the rebels' Daraa offensive concluded on 6 June, resulting in a partial rebel victory. The following day, the government launched a counter-offensive. On 23 June, pro-government media reported that an attempt at a reconciliation deal fell apart, thus the Syrian Army resumed their offensive in the Palestinian Camp district, accompanied by airstrikes. The operation ended on the same day, with the government reportedly capturing at least 50% of the Daraa Refugee Camp

From 29 December 2016 to 30 April 2017, a myriad of groups that allegedly included Tahrir al-Sham launched a multi-phase operation in the Eastern Qalamoun Mountains and the Syrian Desert with the aim to expel the Islamic State of Iraq and the Levant from the desert in southern Syria and to open a supply route between two rebel-held areas. The operation was successful in pushing back ISIL, though they were unable to connect the two rebel-held areas as due to heavy resistance from ISIS. during the operation, the government was also able to take territory from ISIL.

On 7 May, the government launched their desert campaign that initially started along the highway from Damascus to the border with Iraq against rebel forces. Its first intended goal was to capture both the highway and the al-Tanf border crossing, thus securing the Damascus countryside from a potential rebel attack, later, multiple other fronts were opened as part of the operation throughout the desert, as well as operation "Grand Dawn" against ISIL with the aim of reopening the Damascus-Palmyra highway and preparing for an offensive towards Deir ez-Zor. The operation resulted in the Syrian Army encircling the rebel-held Eastern Qalamoun pocket and at the same time erasing the front-line between rebel forces and ISIL in the An-Tanf area.

On 24 June 2017, Tahrir al-Sham, FSA groups, and other rebels reportedly established the Army of Muhammad operations room and launched a new Quneitra offensive, targeting the town of Madinat al-Baath, also known as Baath City. The offensive lasted a week, resulting in a government victory, reversing all rebel gains during the offensive. During the fighting, two stray artillery rounds hit the Israeli-occupied Golan Heights, prompting Israeli forces to target the Syrian military artillery position which according to them was the source of the firing.

On 3 July 2017, a four-day ceasefire was announced by the government, in opposition-held southern Syria.

As a precursor to Astana 5 peace talks, on 9 July 2017 at 0900 GMT, an American-Russian-Jordanian brokered ceasefire commenced, though on 14 July, opposition groups participating in the Quneitra offensive rejected the ceasefire, with clashes resuming across Southern Syria. Besides minor violations from all sides involved, as of 15 July, the ceasefire as held. The Southern Front boycotted these talks.

Many of the "reconciled" fighters have gone on to participate in the Daraa insurgency, starting on 23 November 2018 (including the March 2020 Daraa clashes).

List of battles

Member groups
 Revolutionary Army
 Yarmouk Army
 United Sham Front
 Mu'tazz Billah Brigade
 Muhajireen and Ansar Brigade
 Hasan ibn Ali Brigade
 Dawn of Islam Division
 Free Nawa Forces
 Free Nawa Brigade
 Bani Umayya Brigade
 Farouq Brigade
 Omar Mukhtar Brigade
 Southern Company
 Gaza Houran Brigade
 Clear Victory Brigade
 Muhammad the Conqueror Brigade
 Soldiers of Islam Brigade
 Martyr Ahmad al-Awad Brigade
 Omar ibn al-Khattab Brigade
 Lions of the South Brigade
 Technical Battalion
 Alliance of Southern Forces
 Omari Brigades
 18 March Division
 Martyr Houran
 Liberation of Houran
 Engineering and Rocket Battalion
 Salvation Army
 Free Nawa Division
 8th Infantry Division
 Martyr Jamil Abu Zain Sharaf Division
 Special Task Force Division
 Division of Decisiveness
 Houran Column Division
 Subject of Islam Brigade
 Martyrs of Freedom Division
 Division of Righteousness
 46th Infantry Division
 24th Infantry Division
 69th Special Forces Division
 Free Men of Inkhil Brigade
 Murabitun Brigade
 Lions of Islam Brigade
 Fath al-Mubin Brigade
 Al-Bayt Brigade
 1st Special Tasks Brigade
 Brigade of Dignity
 Southern Alliance
 Syria Revolutionaries Front
 1st Infantry Division
 1st Infantry Gathering
 Gathering of Righteousness
 Brigade of Two Holy Mosques
 Union of the Unity of the Nation
 Saladin Brigades
 Tank Brigade
 63rd Southern Division
 Dawn of the Levant Union
 Abu Dujana Brigades
 Jafar al-Tayyar Brigade
 Lions of Mercy Brigade
 Free Yarmouk Brigade
 Hazm Brigade
 Mercy Brigade
 Southern Martyrs Brigade
 Martyr Abdul Rahim Samour Brigade
 Special Tasks Brigade
 Coming Victory Brigade
 7th Division
 Riyad al-Salehin Battalions of Damascus
 Special Assignments Regiment of Damascus
 Helpers Brigades
 Southern Swords Division
 Martyr Captain Abu Hamza al-Naimi Union
 406th Infantry Division
 Unity of the Nation Brigade
 Hamza Division
 Houran Mujahideen Brigade
 Engineering Battalion
 Lions of Sunna Brigade
 First Corps
 8th Infantry Brigade
 19th Infantry Brigade
 21st Infantry Division
 55th Infantry Brigade
 99th Infantry Division
 Victory Division
 Dawn of Liberation Division
 Knights of Freedom Division
 Oasifat Free South Division
 Sajeel Division
 Company of Dignity Division
 Harra Martyrs Brigade
 1st Artillery Regiment
 Southern Brigades
 Al Mukhtar Brigade
 Descendants of Ibn al-Walid Brigade
 Free Daraa Brigade
 Supporters of the Sunna Brigade
 Farouq Mujahideen Brigade
 Al-Amryn al-Islami Brigade
 Northern Commandos Brigade
 Qastat of Muslims Brigade
 Soldiers of Islam Brigade
 Al-Murabitun Brigade
 Servants of al-Rahman Division
 Tawhid Army
 Hittin Brigade
 Soldiers of Mercy Brigades
 Hamza, Lion of God Brigade
 Black al-Rahman
 Bani Khalid
 Youth of Sunna Forces
 Hamza Division
 Zaidi Cavalry Division
 Caliph Umar ibn Abd al-Aziz Brigade
 Spears of Alwali Brigade
 Martyr Yousef the Great Brigade
 Martyr Ahmed al-Khalaf Brigade
 Zaidi Knights Brigade
 Shield of Lajat Brigade
 Abu Saddam Brigade
 Martyr Ahmed al-Miqdad
 Banner of the Martyrs of Bosra
 Martyr Abdul Razzaq Azaaba Brigade
 Martyr Zuhair al-Zoubi Brigade
 Martyr Akhawsh Brigade
 Descendants of Ali Brigade
 Martyr Obeida Alissa Brigade
 Medical Battalion
 Mujahideen Houran
 Inkhil Martyrs Brigade
 Quneitra Military Council
 Grandsons Brigade
 Quneitra and the Golan Heights Military Council

 Golan Knights Brigade
 Sword of al-Sham Brigades
 Ezz Brigade
 Jesus Christ Brigade
 Supporters of al-Huda
 Descendants of the Prophet Brigade
 Dawn of Syria Brigade
 Osoud al-Sham
 Hamza Lion of God Brigade
 Al-Ezz bin Abdessalam Brigade
 Dignity Brigade
 Ghouta Mujahedin Brigade
 Lower Qalamoun Brigade
 Freedom Martyrs Brigade
 Al-Haramein al-Sharifein Brigade
 Habib Brigade
 Bunyan Battalion
 First Knights' Regiment
 Second Knights' Regiment
 Mutasim Billah Brigade
 al-Shahid Abu Saled Battalion
 Saraya Omawiyeen Battalion
 22nd Infantry Battalion
 Special Assignments Regiment
 Special Assignments Brigade
 Houran Storm Brigade
 Martyr of Houran Brigade
 Fallujah of Houran Brigade
 Houran Tawhid Battalions
 Tawhid al-Lajat Battalion
 Southern Tawhid Brigade
 Western Countryside Freemen Battalion

Former groups
 11th Special Forces Division (left in September 2015 during the establishment of the Company of the People of the Levant, joining the Sham Liberation Army).
 Hawks of the South (dissolved)
 First Army (dissolved)
 Yarmouk Martyrs Brigade (joined ISIL)
 Martyrs of Islam Brigade (left after the September 2016 Daraya evacuation)
 1st Brigade of Damascus (left in May 2016, joined al-Rahman Legion, became independent shortly after)
 Lions of the Asima Brigade (left the Lions of the East Army to join the 8th Brigade of Jaysh al-Islam)
 Commandos of the Desert Brigade defected from the Lions of the East Army to join the SAA.
 Douma Martyrs Brigade (left to form Jaysh al-Ummah, which dissolved in 2015)
 Aisha, Mother of Believers Brigade (left the Southern Brigades to join Jaysh al-Islam's 8th Brigade)
 National Front for the Liberation of Syria member groups
  Dawn of Unity Division (left the Division of Decisiveness of the Alliance of Southern Forces)
 Saladin Division (left the Alliance of Southern Forces)
 Damascus Martyrs Brigade
 Qadisiya Division
 Shield of the Nation Brigade
 1st Commandos Division
 Houran Plains Commandos Brigade
 Southern Commandos Brigade
 Ahmed Khalaf Brigade
 Saqr Hawran Brigade
 Houran Brigade
 Forces of Martyr Ahmad al-Abdo (left after the April 2018 Eastern Qalamoun evacuation)
 Lions of the East Army (left after the April 2018 Eastern Qalamoun evacuation)
 Lions of Umayyad Brigade
 Qadisiya Brigade
 Bayariq al-Shaitat
 Descendants of Aisha Battalion
 Abu Ubaidah ibn al-Jarrah Battalion
 Hamza Battalion
 Son of al-Qaim Brigade
 Mujahid Omar Mukhtar Brigade
 Bashair al-Nasr Brigade
 Ahwaz Brigade
 Conquest Brigade
 Abd Allah ibn al-Zubayr Group
 Jaysh al-Ababil left the Southern Alliance in July 2018 to establish the Army of the South, in response to the encirclement of Daraa city that same month.

See also
 List of armed groups in the Syrian Civil War

References

Anti-government factions of the Syrian civil war
As-Suwayda Governorate in the Syrian civil war
Daraa Governorate in the Syrian civil war
Quneitra Governorate in the Syrian civil war
2014 establishments in Syria